Skylar Mones is an American songwriter, record producer, engineer, and arranger. Skylar’s professional music career began in 2010 doing remixes, engineering and production for Flo Rida, Adam Lambert, Diggy Simmons, and Rihanna. He garnered commercial success as a writer and producer domestically as well as overseas starting in 2012 crafting songs for Namie Amuro, W-inds, Daichi Miura, TVXQ, Ivy Quainoo and E-girls. He currently lives in Los Angeles and continues to write and produce for various international and domestic acts.

Discography

References

Songwriters from New Mexico
Living people
Year of birth missing (living people)